This is a list of writers on Hinduism. The list should include writers who have Wikipedia articles who have written books about Hinduism. Each entry should indicate the writers most well-known work. Multiple works should be listed only if each work has a Wikipedia article.

Religious writers

 Sri Anirvan
 Ramdas Kathiababa
 Swami Santadas Kathiababa
 Sri Aurobindo
 Amma
 Baba Hari Dass
 Chinmayananda
 Ananda Coomaraswamy
 Dayananda
 Eknath Easwaran
 Satsvarupa dasa Goswami
 Mahendranath Gupta
 Krishnananda Saraswati
 Kripalu Maharaj
 Jiddu Krishnamurti
 Ramana Maharshi
 Maharishi Mahesh Yogi
 The Mother
 Nisargadatta Maharaj
 Sister Nivedita
 Srila Prabhupada
 Prabhavananda
 Ram Dass
 Swami Ramdas
 K. D. Sethna
 Sivananda Saraswati
 Dayananda Saraswati
 Ram Swarup
 Tilak
 Vivekananda
 Yogananda

Political writers

	
 François Gautier
 Gandhi
 Ram Gopal	
 Sita Ram Goel
 Sarvepalli Radhakrishnan
 Arun Shourie
 Tilak

Scholars

 Kripalu Maharaj
 Alain Daniélou
 Dharampal
 Wendy Doniger
 Gavin Flood
 Mircea Eliade
 Koenraad Elst
 Georg Feuerstein
 David Frawley
 Subhash Kak
 Hajime Nakamura

See also
 List of modern Eastern religions writers
 List of Hindu comparative religionists
 List of Hindu jurists

Hinduism-related lists
Hinduism